Nando de Freitas is a researcher in the field of machine learning, and in particular in the subfields of neural networks, Bayesian inference and Bayesian optimization, and deep learning.

Biography
De Freitas was born in Zimbabwe. He did his undergraduate studies (1991–94) and MSc (1994–96) at the University of the Witwatersrand, and his PhD at Trinity College, Cambridge (1996-2000). From 2001, he was a professor at the University of British Columbia, before joining the Department of Computer Science at the University of Oxford from 2013 to 2017. He now works for Google's DeepMind.

Awards and recognition
De Freitas has been recognised for his contributions to machine learning through the following awards:

 Best Paper Award at the International Conference on Machine Learning (2016)
 Best Paper Award at the International Conference on Learning Representations (2016)
 Google Faculty Research Award (2014)
 Distinguished Paper Award at the International Joint Conference on Artificial Intelligence (2013)
 Charles A. McDowell Award for Excellence in Research (2012)
 Mathematics of Information Technology and Complex Systems Young Researcher Award (2010)

References

External links
 Nando de Freitas home page

Year of birth missing (living people)
Living people
Zimbabwean scientists
University of the Witwatersrand alumni
Alumni of Trinity College, Cambridge
Academic staff of the University of British Columbia
Members of the Department of Computer Science, University of Oxford
Fellows of Linacre College, Oxford
Machine learning researchers
Artificial intelligence researchers
Google employees
British computer scientists